Thomas the Tank Engine and Friends is a British children's television series based on The Railway Series by the Rev. W. Awdry which was first broadcast in 1984 and the end of 2021. This article lists Thomas books in the Pictureback series released by Random House.

Thomas Gets Tricked and Other Stories

Stories and episodes
Thomas Gets Tricked (Season 1. Episode 1)
Come Out, Henry! (Season 1, Episode 3)
Henry to the Rescue (Season 1, Episode 4)
A Big Day for Thomas (Season 1, Episode 5)

Year
1989

Notes
Introduces Thomas, Edward, Henry, Gordon and Sir Topham Hatt. 
First book used for four stories.
This is the first book and storytelling by Ringo Starr.

Trouble for Thomas and Other Stories

Stories and episodes
Trouble for Thomas (Season 1, Episode 6)
Thomas Saves the Day (Season 1, Episode 7)
Thomas Goes Fishing (Season 1, Episode 12)
Terence the Tractor (Season 1, Episode 13)

Year
1989

Note
Introduces James, Annie and Clarabel, Foolish Freight Cars and Terence the Tractor.

James in a Mess and Other Thomas the Tank Engine Stories

Stories and episodes
James in a Mess (Season 1, Episode 23)
Bertie's Chase (Season 2, Episode 3)
Percy and the Signal (Season 2, Episode 7)
Percy Proves a Point (Season 2, Episode 9)

Year
1993

Notes
Introduces Toby, Henrietta, Percy, Bertie and Harold.
Thomas cannot be seen in this book, but he did star in "Bertie's Chase" and "Percy Proves a Point".
In the original print, the sentence line "It was such an insult to be reminded of the time a bootlace had been used to mend a hole in his coaches." was divided by a page break, showing that this page ends with the word "an," and the next page starts with the word "insult." This is later corrected in the reprint.

A Cow on the Line and Other Thomas the Tank Engine Stories

Stories and episodes
Double Trouble (Season 2, Episode 1)
A Cow on the Line (Season 2, Episode 2)
Old Iron (Season 2, Episode 5)
Percy Takes the Plunge (Season 2, Episode 11)

Year
1992

Notes
Toby cannot be seen in this book, but he did star in "Double Trouble" and "A Cow on the Line".
Bill and Ben made their debut but were not yet introduced.

Diesel's Devious Deed and Other Thomas the Tank Engine Stories

Stories and episodes
Pop Goes the Diesel (Season 2, Episode 12)
Diesel's Devious Deed (Season 2, Episode 13)
A Close Shave for Duck (Season 2, Episode 14)
Woolly Bear (Season 2, Episode 25)

Year
1992

Note
Introduces Duck and Diesel.

Edward's Exploit and Other Thomas The Tank Engine Stories

Stories and episodes
Donald and Douglas (Season 2, Episode 16)
The Deputation (Season 2, Episode 17)
The Diseasel (Season 2, Episode 21)
Edward's Exploit (Season 2, Episode 23)

Year
1993

Notes
Introduces Donald, Douglas, Bill, Ben and BoCo.
Bill and Ben are properly introduced in this book, unlike "Percy Takes the Plunge" in the "A Cow on the Line" book.
Last book used for four stories.
This is the last book and storytelling by Ringo Starr.

The Cranky Day and Other Thomas the Tank Engine Stories

Stories and episodes
Cranky Bugs (Season 5, Episode 1)
Put Upon Percy (Season 5, Episode 9)
Lady Hatt's Birthday Party (Season 5, Episode 4)

Year
2000

Notes
Introduces Cranky, Lady Hatt, Caroline and George.
First book to include three stories.
This is the first book and storytelling by Alec Baldwin.

Α Better View for Gordon and Other Thomas the Tank Engine Stories

Stories and episodes
Toby and the Flood (Season 5, Episode 10)
Α Better View for Gordon (Season 5, Episode 3)
Busy Going Backwards (Season 5, Episode 23)

Year
2001

Note
Introduces Oliver and Toad.

Thomas and the Rumors and Other Thomas the Tank Engine Stories

Stories and episodes
Thomas and the Rumors (Season 5, Episode 17)
James and the Trouble with Trees (Season 5, Episode 5)
Happy Ever After (Season 5, Episode 19)

Year
2002

Notes
Introduces Mrs. Kyndley and Old Slow Coach.
Last book to feature stories from the fifth series

Percy's Chocolate Crunch and Other Thomas the Tank Engine Stories

Stories and episodes
Percy's Chocolate Crunch (Season 6, Episode 18)
Salty's Secret (Season 6, Episode 1)
A Bad Day for Harold the Helicopter (Season 6, Episode 4)

Year
2003

Notes
Introduces Salty and Mavis.
Foolish Freight Cars now called Troublesome Trucks.

James and the Red Balloon and Other Thomas the Tank Engine Stories

Stories and episodes
James and the Red Balloon (Season 6, Episode 15)
Harvey to the Rescue (Season 6, Episode 2)
Thomas and the Jet Engine (Season 6, Episode 22)

Year
2004

Notes
Introduces Harvey.
Stepney is mentioned in this book in the story "James and the Red Balloon", but is not seen.
This is the last book and storytelling by Alec Baldwin.

Hooray for Thomas and Other Thomas the Tank Engine Stories

Stories and episodes
Hooray for Thomas (Season 7, Episode 26)
The Grand Opening (Season 7, Episode 21)
Best Dressed Engine (Season 7, Episode 22)

Year
2005

Notes
Introduces Skarloey, Rheneas, Peter Sam, Rusty, Duncan, Trevor and Murdoch.
Duncan only has a cameo in this book, however he will play a role in the story "Duncan's Bluff" in the "Thomas and the Treasure" book.
Only book to feature stories from the seventh series.
This is the first book and storytelling by Michael Brandon.

Track Stars!: Three Thomas & Friends Stories

Stories and episodes
Thomas Gets it Right (Season 8, Episode 17)
Emily's New Route (Season 8, Episode 10)
Percy's Big Mistake (Season 8, Episode 7)

Year
2006

Notes
Introduces Emily.
Only book to feature stories from eighth series.

Thomas' Milkshake Muddle: Three Thomas & Friends Stories

Stories and episodes
Thomas' Milkshake Muddle (Season 9, Episode 3)
Toby Feels Left Out (Season 9, Episode 12)
Thomas and the New Engine (Season 9, Episode 11)

Year
2007

Note
Introduces Neville and Iron 'Arry & Bert.

Thomas and the Treasure and Other Stories

Stories and episodes
Thomas and the Treasure (Season 10, Episode 26)
Duncan's Bluff (Season 10, Episode 24)
Seeing the Sights (Season 10, Episode 10)

Year
2008

Note
Introduces Mr. Percival.

Steam Engine Stories: Three Thomas & Friends Adventures

Stories and episodes
The Magic Lamp (Season 9, Episode 14)
James Gets a New Coat (Season 8, Episode 5)
Thomas and the Golden Eagle (Season 9, Episode 24)

Year
2008

Notes
Proteus is mentioned in "The Magic Lamp", but he is not seen.
Last book used for three stories.
This is the last book and storytelling by Michael Brandon.

Notes
These books were published by Random House and released in America only.
The books Thomas Gets Tricked and Trouble for Thomas have a saying underneath the front cover and on the back cover, "As seen on the television show Shining Time Station".

Thomas & Friends merchandise
Thomas & Friends